This is a list of foreign ministers in 1998.

Africa
 Algeria - Ahmed Attaf (1996-1999)
 Angola - Venâncio da Silva Moura (1992-1999)
 Benin -
Pierre Osho (1996-1998)
Antoine Idji Kolawolé (1998-2003)
 Botswana - Mompati Merafhe (1994-2008)
 Burkina Faso - Ablassé Ouedraogo (1994-1999)
 Burundi -
Luc Rukingama (1996-1998)
Severin Ntahomvukiye (1998-2001)
 Cameroon - Augustin Kontchou Kouomegni (1997-2001)
 Cape Verde -
Amílcar Spencer Lopes (1996-1998)
José Luís de Jesus (1998-2000)
 Central African Republic - Jean-Mette Yapende (1997-1999)
 Chad - Mahamat Saleh Annadif (1997-2003)
 Comoros -
Ibrahim Ali Mzimba (1997-1998)
Salim Himidi (1998)
Nidhoim Attoumane (1998-1999)
 Republic of Congo - Rodolphe Adada (1997-2007)
 Democratic Republic of Congo -
Bizima Karaha (1997-1998)
Jean-Charles Okoto (1998-1999)
 Côte d'Ivoire - Amara Essy (1990-2000)
 Djibouti - Mohamed Moussa Chehem (1995-1999)
 Egypt - Amr Moussa (1991-2001)
 Equatorial Guinea - Miguel Oyono Ndong Mifumu (1993-1999)
 Eritrea - Haile Woldetensae (1997-2000)
 Ethiopia - Seyoum Mesfin (1991-2010)
 Gabon - Casimir Oyé-Mba (1994-1999)
 The Gambia -
Omar Njie (1997-1998)
Momodou Lamin Sedat Jobe (1998-2001)
 Ghana - Victor Gbeho (1997-2001)
 Guinea - Lamine Camara (1996-1999)
 Guinea-Bissau - Fernando Delfim da Silva (1996-1999)
 Kenya -
Kalonzo Musyoka (1993-1998)
Bonaya Godana (1998-2001)
 Lesotho -
Kelebone Maope (1995-1998)
Tom Thabane (1998-2002)
 Liberia - Monie Captan (1996-2003)
 Libya - Umar Mustafa al-Muntasir (1992-2000)
 Madagascar -
Herizo Razafimahaleo (1997-1998)
Lila Ratsifandrihamanana (1998-2002)
 Malawi - Mapopa Chipeta (1997-1999)
 Mali - Modibo Sidibe (1997-2002)
 Mauritania -
Mohamed El Hacen Ould Lebatt (1997-1998)
Cheikh El Avia Ould Mohamed Khouna (1998)
Ahmed Ould Sid'Ahmed (1998-2001)
 Mauritius - Rajkeswur Purryag (1997-2000)
 Morocco - Abdellatif Filali (1985-1999)
 Western Sahara -
Bachir Mustafa Sayed (1997-1998)
Mohamed Salem Ould Salek (1998–2023)
 Mozambique - Leonardo Simão (1994-2005)
 Namibia - Theo-Ben Gurirab (1990-2002)
 Niger - Maman Sambo Sidikou (1997-1999)
 Nigeria -
Tom Ikimi (1995-1998)
Ignatius Olisemeka (1998-1999)
 Rwanda - Anastase Gasana (1994-1999)
 São Tomé and Príncipe - Homero Jeronimo Salvaterra (1996-1999)
 Senegal -
Moustapha Niasse (1993-1998)
Jacques Baudin (1998-2000)
 Seychelles - Jérémie Bonnelame (1997-2005)
 Sierra Leone -
Paolo Bangura (1997-1998)
Sama Banya (1998-2001)
 Somalia - no central government
 Somaliland - Mahmud Salah Nur (1997-2001)
 South Africa - Alfred Baphethuxolo Nzo (1994-1999)
 Sudan -
Ali Osman Taha (1995-1998)
Mustafa Osman Ismail (1998-2005)
 Swaziland -
Arthur Khoza (1995-1998)
Albert Nhlanhla Shabangu (1998-2001)
 Tanzania - Jakaya Kikwete (1995-2006)
 Togo -
Koffi Panou (1996-1998)
Joseph Kokou Koffigoh (1998-2000)
 Tunisia - Said Ben Mustapha (1997-1999)
 Uganda - Eriya Kategaya (1996-2001)
 Zambia - Keli Walubita (1997-2002)
 Zimbabwe - Stan Mudenge (1995-2005)

Asia
 Afghanistan -
Mullah Abdul Jalil (1997-1998)
Mullah Mohammad Hassan (1998-1999)
 Armenia -
Alexander Arzumanyan (1996-1998)
Vartan Oskanian (1998-2008)
 Azerbaijan -
Hasan Hasanov (1993-1998)
Tofig Zulfugarov (1998-1999)
 Nagorno-Karabakh - Naira Melkumyan (1997-2002)
 Bahrain - Sheikh Muhammad ibn Mubarak ibn Hamad Al Khalifah (1971-2005)
 Bangladesh - Abdus Samad Azad (1996-2001)
 Bhutan -
Dawa Tsering (1972-1998)
Jigme Thinley (1998-2003)
 Brunei - Pengiran Muda Mohamed Bolkiah (1984–2015)
 Cambodia -
Ung Huot (1994-1998)
Hor Namhong (1998–2016)
 China -
Qian Qichen (1988-1998)
Tang Jiaxuan (1998-2003)
 Georgia - Irakli Menagarishvili (1995-2003)
 Abkhazia - Sergei Shamba (1997-2004)
 South Ossetia - Murat Dzhioyev (1998-2012)
 India -
I. K. Gujral (1996-1998)
Atal Bihari Vajpayee (1998)
Jaswant Singh (1998-2002)
 Indonesia - Ali Alatas (1988-1999)
 Iran - Kamal Kharazi (1997-2005)
 Iraq - Muhammad Saeed al-Sahhaf (1992-2001)
 Israel -
David Levy (1996-1998)
Benjamin Netanyahu (1998)
Ariel Sharon (1998-1999)
 Japan -
Keizō Obuchi (1997-1998)
Masahiko Kōmura (1998-1999)
 Jordan -
Fayez al-Tarawneh (1997-1998)
Jawad Anani (1998)
Abdul Ilah Khatib (1998-2002)
 Kazakhstan - Kassym-Jomart Tokayev (1994-1999)
 North Korea -
Kim Yong-nam (1983-1998)
Paek Nam-sun (1998-2007)
 South Korea -
Yu Jong-ha (1996-1998)
Bak Jeong-su (1998)
Hong Soon-young (1998-2000)
 Kuwait - Sheikh Sabah Al-Ahmad Al-Jaber Al-Sabah (1978-2003)
 Kyrgyzstan - Muratbek Imanaliyev (1997-2002)
 Laos - Somsavat Lengsavad (1993-2006)
 Lebanon -
Farès Boueiz (1992-1998)
Selim al-Hoss (1998-2000)
 Malaysia - Abdullah Ahmad Badawi (1991-1999)
 Maldives - Fathulla Jameel (1978-2005)
 Mongolia -
Shukher Altangerel (1997-1998)
Rinchinnyamyn Amarjargal (1998)
Nyam-Osoryn Tuyaa (1998-2000)
 Myanmar -
Ohn Gyaw (1991-1998)
Win Aung (1998-2004)
 Nepal -
Kamal Thapa (1997-1998)
Girija Prasad Koirala (1998-1999)
 Oman - Yusuf bin Alawi bin Abdullah (1982–2020)
 Pakistan -
Gohar Ayub Khan (1997-1998)
Sartaj Aziz (1998-1999)
 Philippines - Domingo Siazon, Jr. (1995-2001)
 Qatar - Sheikh Hamad bin Jassim bin Jaber Al Thani (1992-2013)
 Saudi Arabia - Prince Saud bin Faisal bin Abdulaziz Al Saud (1975–2015)
 Singapore - S. Jayakumar (1994-2004)
 Sri Lanka - Lakshman Kadirgamar (1994-2001)
 Syria - Farouk al-Sharaa (1984-2006)
 Taiwan - Jason Hu (1997-1999)
 Tajikistan - Talbak Nazarov (1994-2006)
 Thailand - Surin Pitsuwan (1997-2001)
 Turkey - İsmail Cem (1997-2002)
 Turkmenistan - Boris Şyhmyradow (1995-2000)
 United Arab Emirates - Rashid Abdullah Al Nuaimi (1980-2006)
 Uzbekistan - Abdulaziz Komilov (1994-2003)
 Vietnam - Nguyễn Mạnh Cầm (1991-2000)
 Yemen -
Abd al-Karim al-Iryani (1994-1998)
Abdul Qadir Bajamal (1998-2001)

Australia and Oceania
 Australia - Alexander Downer (1996-2007)
 Fiji - Berenado Vunibobo (1997-1999)
 Kiribati -  Teburoro Tito (1994-2003)
 Marshall Islands - Phillip H. Muller (1994-2000)
 Micronesia - Epel K. Ilon (1997-2000)
 Nauru -
Kinza Clodumar (1997-1998)
Bernard Dowiyogo (1998-1999)
 New Zealand - Don McKinnon (1990-1999)
 Cook Islands - Inatio Akaruru (1989-1999)
 Palau - Sabino Anastacio (1997-2000)
 Papua New Guinea - Roy Yaki (1997-1999)
 Samoa -
Tofilau Eti Alesana (1988-1998)
Tuilaepa Sailele Malielegaoi (1998–2021)
 Solomon Islands - Patterson Oti (1997-2000)
 Tonga -
Prince Tupouto'a Tungi (1979-1998)
Baron Vaea (1998)
Prince 'Ulukalala Lavaka Ata (1998-2004)
 Tuvalu - Bikenibeu Paeniu (1996-1999)
 Vanuatu -
Vital Soksok (1997-1998)
Donald Kalpokas (1998)
Clement Leo (1998-1999)

Europe
 Albania - Paskal Milo (1997-2001)
 Andorra - Albert Pintat (1997-2001)
 Austria - Wolfgang Schüssel (1995-2000)
 Belarus -
Ivan Antanovich (1997-1998)
Ural Latypov (1998-2000)
 Belgium - Erik Derycke (1995-1999)
 Brussels-Capital Region - Jos Chabert (1989-1999)
 Flanders - Luc Van den Brande (1992-1999)
 Wallonia - William Ancion (1996-1999)
 Bosnia and Herzegovina - Jadranko Prlić (1996-2001)
 Republika Srpska - Aleksa Buha (1992-1998)
 Bulgaria - Nadezhda Mihailova (1997-2001)
 Croatia - Mate Granić (1993-2000)
 Cyprus - Ioannis Kasoulidis (1997-2003)
 Northern Cyprus -
 Taner Etkin (1996-1998)
 Tahsin Ertuğruloğlu (1998-2004)
 Czech Republic -
Jaroslav Šedivý (1997-1998)
Jan Kavan (1998-2002)
 Denmark - Niels Helveg Petersen (1993-2000)
 Estonia -
Toomas Hendrik Ilves (1996-1998)
Raul Mälk (1998-1999)
 Finland - Tarja Halonen (1995-2000)
 France - Hubert Védrine (1997-2002)
 Germany -
Klaus Kinkel (1992-1998)
Joschka Fischer (1998-2005)
 Greece - Theodoros Pangalos (1996-1999)
 Hungary -
László Kovács (1994-1998)
János Martonyi (1998-2002)
 Iceland - Halldór Ásgrímsson (1995-2004)
 Ireland - David Andrews (1997-2000)
 Italy - Lamberto Dini (1996-2001)
 Latvia - Valdis Birkavs (1994-1999)
 Liechtenstein - Andrea Willi (1993-2001)
 Lithuania - Algirdas Saudargas (1996-2000)
 Luxembourg - Jacques Poos (1984-1999)
 Macedonia -
Blagoje Handžiski (1997-1998)
Aleksandar Dimitrov (1998-2000)
 Malta -
George Vella (1996-1998)
Guido de Marco (1998-1999)
 Moldova - Nicolae Tăbăcaru (1997-2000)
 Netherlands -
Hans van Mierlo (1994-1998)
Jozias van Aartsen (1998-2002)
 Norway - Knut Vollebæk (1997-2000)
 Poland - Bronisław Geremek (1997-2000)
 Portugal - Jaime Gama (1995-2002)
 Romania - Andrei Pleşu (1997-1999)
 Russia -
Yevgeny Primakov (1996-1998)
Igor Ivanov (1998-2004)
 Chechnya -
 Movladi Udugo (1997-1998)
 Akhyad Idigov (1998-1999)
 San Marino - Gabriele Gatti (1986-2002)
 Slovakia -
Zdenka Kramplová (1997-1998)
Eduard Kukan (1998-2006)
 Slovenia - Boris Frlec (1997-2000)
 Spain - Abel Matutes (1996-2000)
 Sweden -
Lena Hjelm-Wallén (1994-1998)
Anna Lindh (1998-2003)
 Switzerland - Flavio Cotti (1993-1999)
 Ukraine -
 Hennadiy Udovenko (1994-1998)
 Borys Tarasyuk (1998-2000)
 United Kingdom - Robin Cook (1997-2001)
 Vatican City - Archbishop Jean-Louis Tauran (1990-2003)
 Yugoslavia -
Milan Milutinović (1995-1998)
Živadin Jovanović (1998-2000)
 Montenegro - Branko Perović (1997-2000)

North America and the Caribbean
 Antigua and Barbuda - Lester Bird (1991-2004)
 The Bahamas - Janet Bostwick (1994-2002)
 Barbados - Billie Miller (1994-2008)
 Belize -
Dean Barrow (1993-1998)
Said Musa (1998-2002)
 Canada - Lloyd Axworthy (1996-2000)
 Quebec -
 Sylvain Simard (1996-1998)
 Louise Beaudoin (1998-2003)
 Costa Rica -
Fernando Naranjo Villalobos (1994-1998)
Roberto Rojas López (1998-2002)
 Cuba - Roberto Robaina (1993-1999)
 Dominica -
Edison James (1995-1998)
Norris Charles (1998-2000)
 Dominican Republic - Eduardo Latorre Rodríguez (1996-2000)
 El Salvador - Ramón Ernesto González Giner (1995-1999)
 Grenada -
Raphael Fletcher (1997-1998)
Mark Isaac (1998-1999)
 Guatemala - Eduardo Stein (1996-2000)
 Haiti - Fritz Longchamp (1995-2001)
 Honduras -
Delmer Urbizo Panting (1995-1998)
Fernando Martínez Jiménez (1998-1999)
 Jamaica - Seymour Mullings (1995-2000)
 Mexico -
José Ángel Gurría (1994-1998)
Rosario Green (1998-2000)
 Nicaragua -
Emilio Álvarez Montalván (1997-1998)
Eduardo Montealegre (1998-2000)
 Panama -
Ricardo Alberto Arias (1996-1998)
Jorge Eduardo Ritter (1998-1999)
 Puerto Rico – Norma Burgos (1995–1999)
 Saint Kitts and Nevis - Denzil Douglas (1995-2000)
 Saint Lucia - George Odlum (1997-2001)
 Saint Vincent and the Grenadines -
Alpian Allen (1994-1998)
Allan Cruickshank (1998-2001)
 Trinidad and Tobago - Ralph Maraj (1995-2000)
 United States - Madeleine Albright (1997-2001)

South America
 Argentina - Guido di Tella (1991-1999)
 Bolivia - Javier Murillo de la Rocha (1997-2001)
 Brazil - Luiz Felipe Palmeira Lampreia (1995-2001)
 Chile - José Miguel Insulza (1994-1999)
 Colombia -
María Emma Mejía Vélez (1996-1998)
Camilo Reyes (1998)
Guillermo Fernández de Soto (1998-2002)
 Ecuador - José Ayala Lasso (1997-1999)
 Guyana - Clement Rohee (1992-2001)
 Paraguay -
Rubén Melgarejo Lanzoni (1996-1998)
Dido Florentin Bogado (1998-1999)
 Peru -
Eduardo Ferrero Costa (1997-1998)
Fernando de Trazegnies (1998-2000)
 Suriname - Errol Snijders (1997-2000)
 Uruguay -
Álvaro Ramos Trigo (1995-1998)
Didier Opertti (1998-2005)
 Venezuela - Miguel Ángel Burelli Rivas (1994-1999)

1998 in politics
1998 in international relations
Foreign ministers
1998